Since 1976, when the United States budget process was revised by the  Budget Act of 1974 the
United States Federal Government has had funding gaps on 22 occasions. Funding gaps did not lead to government shutdowns prior to 1980 when President Jimmy Carter requested opinions from Attorney General Benjamin Civiletti on funding gaps and the Antideficiency Act. His first opinion said that all government work must stop if Congress did not agree to pay for it. He later issued a second opinion that allowed essential government services to continue in the absence of a spending bill. Ten of the funding gaps led to federal government employees being furloughed.

List

Presidential summary

Notes

References

External links
A Timeline of U.S. Government shutowns, Infogram

Government shutdowns in the United States
Government finances in the United States